The following lists contain musical instruments, categorized according to the Hornbostel–Sachs system by how they make sound.

Idiophones

List of idiophones by Hornbostel–Sachs number

Membranophones
List of membranophones by Hornbostel–Sachs number

Chordophones
List of chordophones by Hornbostel–Sachs number

Aerophones

List of aerophones by Hornbostel–Sachs number

Electrophones
Electrophones are instruments in which sound is generated by electrical means. While it is not officially in any published form of the Hornbostel–Sachs system, and hence, lacking proper numerical subdivisions, it is often considered a fifth main category.

Croix Sonore
Denis d'or
Drum machine
Hammond organ
Keyboard bass
Kraakdoos (or Cracklebox)
Mellotron
Ondes Martenot
Synclavier
Synthesizer
Tannerin (a.k.a. Electro-Theremin)
Telharmonium
Theremin

Instruments that do not fit into any of the above five categories
A number of instruments neither fit wholly into any one of the above 5 categories, nor can they be properly described as belonging to some combination of these categories.
Within the Hornbostel Sachs system they therefore do not have a number (hence the label NaN = Not a Number).

Hydraulophones
The first three Hornbostel Sachs numbers describe instruments that make sound from matter in its solid state. The fourth HS number describes instruments that make sound from matter in its gaseous state (air). The fifth HS number describes instruments that make sound from electricity and/or electrical energy.

Recently a number of instruments have been invented, designed, and made, that make sound from matter in its liquid state. This new class of instruments is called hydraulophones. Hydraulophones use an incompressible fluid, such as water, as the initial sound-producing medium, and they may also use the hydraulic fluid as a user-interface.

Plasmaphones
Another category of instruments has recently been invented that use matter in higher energy states, such as plasma, to produce the initial sound. These instruments are called plasmaphones. As flame is matter in a high energy state the class comprises the much older pyrophones.

Non-electrophonic quintephones
A number of computational musical instruments that are not electrophones have been invented, designed, built, and used in performances.  These instruments are sound synthesizers that use mechanical, optical, or other forms of non-electric computation, sampling, processing, or the like.

It has been proposed that music synthesizers that perform computation, and/or that work by recording and playback of sound samples, or the like, be referred to as quintephones.  This class of instrument includes electrophones as a special case.

References

External links
Classification of Musical Instruments: Translated from the Original German by Anthony Baines and Klaus P. Wachsmann Erich M. von Hornbostel and Curt Sachs. The Galpin Society Journal volume 14, March 1961 pages 3-25 
Comprehensive Table of Musical Instrument Classifications
Vietnamese Chordophones
Arabic Chordophones
more chordophones
Oddmusic A website dedicated to unique, odd, ethnic, experimental and unusual musical instruments and resources. 
From the University of Washington Libraries Digital Collections – Ethnomusicology Collection: A collection of photographs of over 250 musical instruments from around the world.
Idiophones
Membranophones
Chordophones
Aerophones